Cabaret is a form of entertainment traditionally performed on stage at a restaurant or nightclub.

Cabaret may also refer to:

Arts and entertainment

Music
 Cabaret (musical), a Broadway musical, originally produced in 1966
 "Cabaret" (Cabaret song), the title song from the musical
 "Cabaret" (Justin Timberlake song), 2013
 Cabaret (Das Ich album), the thirteenth album of Das Ich, released in 2006

Film
 Cabaret (1927 film), a silent crime drama
 Cabaret (1953 film), a Spanish musical film
 Cabaret (1972 film), a musical drama by Bob Fosse, inspired by the Broadway musical
 Cabaret (2019 film), an Indian film

Television
 Cabaret (British TV series), a British variety series (1936–46) on BBC Television
 Cabaret (TV series), a Canadian variety television series (1955)
 "Cabaret" (D:TNG episode), an episode from the first season of Degrassi: The Next Generation

Other uses
 Cabaret club, a term for host and hostess clubs in Asia
 Cabaret (food), a kind of food including gelatin, aspic, carrot, eggs and peas
 Cabaret, Ouest, a commune in the Ouest department of Haiti
 Pierre Roger de Cabaret, 13th century Occitan military leader in the Albigensian Crusade

See also
 Classic Cabaret, or American Cabaret, a form of Turkish belly dancing performed in the United States